Enciklopedio Kalblanda, edited from 1996 to 2001, was the first online encyclopedia written in the Esperanto language. It was founded on January 11, 1996 by Stephen Kalb, who was the general editor. The encyclopedia contained 139 articles linked to 85 other themes. The text of the encyclopedia (though not the pictures) is under the GFDL.

In December 2001, Kalb donated his 139 articles to the Esperanto Wikipedia, to be expanded. It is linked on Vikipedio as Enciklopedio Kalblanda. He now contributes directly to Vikipedio.

Imported articles

References

External links 
Kalb Encyclopedia at Internet Archive 

Online encyclopedias
Esperanto encyclopedias
Free-content websites
20th-century encyclopedias
21st-century encyclopedias